WCCI (100.3 FM) is a radio station licensed to Savanna, Illinois, and serving  Northwest Illinois, and Eastern Iowa.  WCCI has a country music format and is owned by Carroll County Communications.

History

WCCI was founded by Dennis Voy, who began his radio career at KMAQ in Maquoketa, Iowa in 1958, when that station signed on for the first time.  Voy later purchased that station in 1965 and formed Carroll County Broadcasting Company with Randy C. Smith in 1970 with the intent of putting this station on the air.
 
WCCI's construction permit was first granted on December 12, 1970 to operate at 100.1 mHz with an effective radiated power of 3,000 watts. Studios were located at 316 Main Street in Savanna.  

Voy sold the station in May 1976 to Carroll County Communications, Inc.  This entity still controls the station today.

WCCI moved to its current frequency of 100.3 MHz in 1990 in order to increase its power to its current level.

External links
 WCCI's website

Country radio stations in the United States
CCI
Radio stations established in 1971